Koray Caliskan is an economic sociologist, Associate Professor of Strategic Design and Management at Parsons School of Design, The New School and Associate Editor of the Journal of Cultural Economy.

Education
He received his B.A. in Political Science, Bogazici University, Istanbul and M.A. in Politics, NYU, New York in 1999. He received his Ph.D. with distinction from NYU’s Politics Department, with which he won the Malcolm Kerr Social Science Award from MESA.

Publications
His book Market Threads: How Cotton Farmers and Traders Create a Global Commodity came out from Princeton University Press and focused on global commodity markets and relations of economization.

Film projects
He directed, produced and wrote seven fiction and documentary films, including Esma, shown at the Cannes Film Festival. His last research project on cryptocurrencies, their global communities and blockchains was selected to be a winner of the Scientific Breakthrough of the Year Award in Social Sciences and Humanities by the Falling Walls Foundation. His book, based on this research, Data Money: Cryptocurrencies and their Communities, Blockchains and Markets will come out in 2022 from Columbia University Press. Currently, on an ESRC grant, he is carrying out research with his team on the economic sociology of digital advertisements.

He was also the writer and director of the short film "Esma". He was the producer and co-writer of "In Flames", feature film. He was the director of the film "Last Villagers of Avshar", producer of "Pipelines Made up of Donkeys" film and producer of the documentary "Republic of Wonderland: Turkish TV Series in the World".

Social activism
He is the founder of Mamame, a social innovation project bringing together the organizational form of cooperative and limited liability company in economizing under-represented women’s labor, which won the Entrepreneurship of the Year Award in 2017 from Microsoft Turkey.

Research work
His recent research project was recently awarded a Breakthrough Prize in Social Sciences and Humanities from the Falling Walls foundation as of August 2021.

References

External links
 

Economic sociologists
Parsons School of Design faculty
Year of birth missing (living people)
Living people
Turkish sociologists